Márcio Longo de Araújo (born 7 May 1960) is a Brazilian professional football coach and former player who played as either a central defender or a defensive midfielder.

Playing career
Born in São José do Rio Pardo, São Paulo, Márcio Araújo was a São Paulo youth graduate. Despite making his first team debut in 1978, he only started to feature more regularly in 1983, after a loan to São Bento.

Ahead of the 1987 season, Márcio Araújo left the Tricolor and signed for Noroeste, but moved to Portuguesa in the following year. In 1991, he signed for Coritiba, and after five league matches, he retired.

Coaching career
Shortly after retiring, Márcio Araújo began his coaching career at Ponte Preta's Aspirantes (under-23) team. He then returned to São Paulo to manage their under-20 squad, and won the 1993 Copa São Paulo de Futebol Júnior, having Rogério Ceni as his first-choice goalkeeper; in that year, he was also head coach of the main squad on some occasions, as the club opted to rest the first team.

In August 1993, Márcio Araújo was head coach of Corinthians for one match, before the arrival of Mário Sérgio. In 1995, he was named assistant coach at Palmeiras, but was appointed head coach in January 1997 after Vanderlei Luxemburgo moved to Santos.

Márcio Araújo was fired by Verdão on 27 May 1997, after two consecutive defeats to rivals Corinthians and São Paulo. On 1 December, he took over Inter de Limeira for the ensuing Campeonato Paulista, and subsequently moved to Paraná, helping the latter to narrowly avoid relegation.

Márcio Araújo left Paraná in the end of the 1998 campaign, but was appointed head coach of the club again in February 1999. He left the club in July, and replaced Abel Braga at the helm of Coritiba in September.

After leaving Coritiba on 9 December 1999, Márcio Araújo was appointed head coach of Atlético Mineiro the following 12 February. He resigned in July, and subsequently worked at Rio Claro before returning to Palmeiras as a technical coordinator.

In March 2001, Márcio Araújo was named interim head coach of Verdão, after Marco Aurélio resigned. He returned to his previous role after the appointment of Celso Roth, but was again appointed head coach in October after Roth was fired.

Márcio Araújo returned to Rio Claro for the 2002 season, and was in charge of Guaratinguetá before being presented at Fortaleza on 19 August 2003. He was relieved of his duties on 19 December, and spent the 2004 campaign as Marco Aurélio's assistant at Cruzeiro.

Márcio Araújo returned to coaching duties on 25 June 2005, after being named head coach of Avaí. Dismissed on 3 October, he returned to Coritiba late in the month, but was sacked from the latter on 24 February 2006.

On 2 February 2007, Márcio Araújo returned to Rio Claro for a third spell, but left the club to return to Guaratinguetá on 13 March. He won the Campeonato do Interior with the latter side in the 2007 Campeonato Paulista, before being named in charge of Goiás on 20 September.

Dismissed by Goiás on 30 November 2007, Márcio Araújo replaced Gelson Silva at the helm of Grêmio Barueri on 19 February 2008. He opted to leave the club in April, but returned to the club in August. After achieving a first-ever promotion in the 2008 Série B, he left the club again after failing to agree new terms.

Márcio Araújo returned to Guará on 1 March 2009, but suffered relegation in the year's Paulistão. He took over Figueirense on 29 August, and left on 1 December after failing to achieve promotion.

On 22 December 2009, Márcio Araújo was appointed head coach of Sertãozinho for the 2010 Campeonato Paulista, but resigned the following 4 February, after only six matches. On 11 August 2010, he was named at the helm of Bahia, and helped in their return to the top tier after a seven-year absence. Shortly after achieving promotion, he left the club after rejecting a contract renewal.

On 12 September 2011, Márcio Araújo replaced Vadão as head coach of São Caetano. The following 25 May, he was dismissed by the club.

On 23 February 2015, after nearly three years without a club, Márcio Araújo took over Bragantino, but was replaced by Vágner Benazzi on 20 March. In 2019, he became Fernando Diniz's assistant at Fluminense, and also worked with Diniz at São Paulo and Santos. On 6 July 2021, he left the latter club after alleging "personal reasons".

Career statistics

Coaching statistics

Honours

Player
São Paulo
Campeonato Paulista: 1981, 1985
Campeonato Brasileiro Série A: 1986

Coach
São Paulo U20
Copa São Paulo de Futebol Júnior: 1993

Atlético Mineiro
Campeonato Mineiro: 2000

References

External links
Futebol de Goyaz profile 

1960 births
Living people
Footballers from São Paulo (state)
Brazilian footballers
Campeonato Brasileiro Série A players
Association football defenders
Association football midfielders
São Paulo FC players
Esporte Clube São Bento players
Esporte Clube Noroeste players
Associação Portuguesa de Desportos players
Coritiba Foot Ball Club players
Brazilian football managers
Campeonato Brasileiro Série A managers
São Paulo FC managers
Sport Club Corinthians Paulista managers
Sociedade Esportiva Palmeiras managers
Associação Atlética Internacional (Limeira) managers
Paraná Clube managers
Coritiba Foot Ball Club managers
Clube Atlético Mineiro managers
Rio Claro Futebol Clube managers
Guaratinguetá Futebol managers
Fortaleza Esporte Clube managers
Avaí FC managers
Goiás Esporte Clube managers
Grêmio Barueri Futebol managers
Sertãozinho Futebol Clube managers
Esporte Clube Bahia managers
Associação Desportiva São Caetano managers
Clube Atlético Bragantino managers
Santos FC non-playing staff
People from São José do Rio Pardo